Antonia Frederika Wesseloh is a German fashion model.

Career 
Wesseloh sent photos to several modeling agencies; while others rejected, Modelwerk Modeling Agency signed her immediately.

She debuted at Escada. She has walked for Richard Chai, Rodarte, Louis Vuitton, Anna Sui, Balenciaga, Marc Jacobs, Miu Miu, Giles, Just Cavalli, Peter Som, Loewe, Lacoste, Thakoon, Sonia Rykiel, Costume National, Prabal Gurung, Marni, Chanel, Viktor & Rolf, Topshop, Yigal Azrouel, and Cynthia Rowley in her first season.

In 2011, renowned photographer Steven Meisel selected her for a Prada campaign.

Wesseloh has appeared in Vogue, i-D, Dazed, Vogue Japan and Vogue China.

References

External links 
 

1995 births
Living people
People from Hamburg
German female models